The Very Hungry Caterpillar is a 1969 children’s picture book designed, illustrated, and written by Eric Carle. The book features a hungry caterpillar that eats a variety of foods before pupating and emerging as a butterfly. It has won many children’s literature awards and major graphic design awards. It has sold upwards of 50 million copies worldwide, selling roughly a copy per thirty seconds since its publication. The book has been lauded as “one of the greatest childhood classics of all time.” Its ‘eaten’ holes and collage artwork were innovative for its time. The book includes counting, days of the week, food, and a butterfly’s life cycle, which contribute to juvenile education. Carle’s original work has been the basis for various tie-in products.

Synopsis

On an early Sunday morning, “a tiny and very hungry caterpillar” hatches from his egg. Then, he searches for something to eat. For the following five days, Monday through Friday, the very hungry caterpillar eats through an increasing quantity of delicious fruit: one apple on Monday, two pears on Tuesday, three plums on Wednesday, four strawberries on Thursday, and five oranges on Friday. Each day, however, the caterpillar is still hungry. On Saturday, he feasts, eating a piece of chocolate cake, a strawberry ice cream cone, a pickle, a slice of Swiss cheese, a slice of salami, a lollipop, a piece of cherry pie, a sausage, a cupcake and a slice of watermelon. That night, he gets a stomach ache from the unhealthy overeating.

To recover from Saturday’s stomach ache, the very hungry caterpillar eats one green leaf on Sunday (a week has passed), and then feels much better. He is no longer little and hungry; he is now a big and fat caterpillar. He builds a cocoon around himself. He stays inside of it for two weeks, after which he nibbles a hole and pushes his way out. Finally, he develops into a large, beautiful, multi-colored butterfly. As a butterfly, the cycle begins again. Carle’s story mimics a caterpillar’s actual life cycle: eating, growing, spinning, and finally metamorphosing into a butterfly.

Development
The Very Hungry Caterpillar is Carle's third book.

Carle was inspired by a hole punch; one day he was hole punching a stack of paper, thought of a bookworm, and created the story A Week with Willi the Worm. A Week with Willi the Worm featured a bookworm named Willi. Ann Beneduce, Carle's editor, advised that a green worm would not make a likable protagonist. Beneduce suggested a caterpillar to which Carle responded “butterfly”; hence, the idea for the book was cemented.

The differently shaped pages with holes representing the caterpillar's trail through foodstuffs were a challenge, but Carle was familiar with "differently shaped pages" from books that he read as a child in Germany.

Publication 
The book was originally published by the World Publishing Company (US) in 1969. It was originally printed in Japan due to high US publishing costs. After the World Publishing Company, Penguin Random House became the book’s publisher. In 2019, Penguin bought the title from Carle.

Since its production, The Very Hungry Caterpillar has sold roughly one copy every thirty seconds.

The book has been translated more than 60 languages, including Arabic, Dutch, French, Spanish, German, Japanese, Italian, Portuguese, Swedish, Russian, and Hebrew.

Reception

Awards 
The book has won numerous awards including the American Institute of Graphic Arts Award in 1970, the Best Children’s Books of England 1970, the Selection du Grand Prix des Treize in France in 1972, and the Nakamori Reader's Prize in Japan in 1975. The New York Times also cited it as one of the “Ten Best Picture Books of the Year” in 1969.

Furthermore, the book placed at number 199 in the Big Read, a 2003 poll conducted by the BBC to determine the United Kingdom's best loved books. It was one of a few picture books to place on the list. Based on a 2007 online poll, the National Education Association listed the book as one of its "Teachers' Top 100 Books for Children". Five years later, School Library Journal survey of readers named The Very Hungry Caterpillar as the second-best children’s book.

More recently in 2020, The Very Hungry Caterpillar was number ten on the list of "Top Check Outs of All Time" by the New York Public Library. It also won the best children’s classic accolade at the Sainsbury Children’s Book Awards in 2019. Carle said that this award was a “perfect way” to celebrate the book’s 50th anniversary.

Endorsements 
The Very Hungry Caterpillar introduces Lepidoptera life stage concepts depicting metamorphosis from a ‘hungry caterpillar’ to a ‘beautiful butterfly'; the Royal Entomological Society endorsed the book due to the scientific accuracy of this transformation.

Issues and bans 
The book was removed from libraries in Herefordshire, England in an effort to promote healthy eating.

In 2021, researchers from Edith Cowan University in Western Australia criticised a number of books, including The Very Hungry Caterpillar, for not being culturally diverse, and finding that teachers were over-relying on classic titles which reflected dominant culture and outdated viewpoints and lifestyles. In an article for the Australian Journal of Teacher Education, the researchers expressed concern about classic books which only contained animal characters, finding that animal stories decrease the likelihood of children from minority backgrounds seeing characters representative of themselves. They recommended classic titles be placed alongside more contemporary texts which better represent a more modern culturally-diverse society.  The findings were criticised by media commentators such as Kel Richards and Erin Molan.

Educational usage and influence
This book includes educational themes including counting, the days of the week, foods, and a butterfly’s life stages. However, the book does not appear as didactic; rather, it presents information discreetly without children realizing it. It has been used by elementary school teachers, librarians, and parents as a teaching aid, with activities developed which use the book. Furthermore, the pictures allow for understanding without reading.

Predictability 
The book contains “familiar sequences” or patterns when referencing days of the week and numbers. These patterns help young readers read naturally and reflect their own personal knowledge about the world. Furthermore, these patterns encourage word recognition strategies while reading, rather than beforehand. Therefore, predictability helps establish understanding within context.

The book’s predictability also allows for oral cloze exercises, exercises where an adult reader can omit a day of the week or number and the child can insert it. These exercises help children gain confidence in predicting language and enforcing pre-existing knowledge.

Common core 
New elementary common core standards emphasize more informational texts in primary education; books like The Very Hungry Caterpillar mend the divide between informational texts and elementary engagement. The book is captivating for young learners, while also providing lessons on counting, days of the week, and metamorphosis.

Storytelling/Classroom activities 
The Very Hungry Caterpillar’s format allows for expansion into a classroom activity. Children can engage in creative practice and storytelling by inserting their own foods and drawings into each day of the week. Using the book’s format children can incorporate their own interests; thus, they are telling their own stories. Sharing their renditions with peers, students again engage with storytelling.

Secondary school usage 
The Very Hungry Caterpillar has met Beowulf in secondary classrooms in an effort to prompt academic and sophisticated discussion of picture books. Main reasons for integration include the universal themes of picture books and providing visual aids for comprehension. The Very Hungry Caterpillar has themes that extend past young children and its integration with Beowulf helps engage secondary aged students.

Healthy eating 
This book has been instrumental in fighting childhood obesity. The American Academy of Pediatrics, the CDC, philanthropic groups, and anti-obesity campaigns utilize this book to teach children about healthy eating. In 2011, the American Academy of Pediatrics sent out special copies of the book, with associated learning tools, to health providers, for a campaign to healthy eating in the U.S. Carle supports the usage of his book to promote healthy eating.

Cultural influence 
This book was used by former first lady Barbara Bush as part of her campaign to promote literacy. In 1999, the pizza restaurant Pizza Hut asked 50 U.S. governors to name their favorite books from childhood. The then-governor of Texas, George W. Bush, named The Very Hungry Caterpillar, despite having been of college age at the time of its publication.

In 2009, Google celebrated the book's 40th anniversary by rendering the logo on its main search page in the style used in the book.

UK/US releases

VHS 
The Very Hungry Caterpillar was adapted for UK television on September 1, 1993. Then on October 17, 1994, it was released as a VHS video distributed by PolyGram Video. After which, it was re-released on June 16, 1997, distributed by Channel 5 Video, a sub-label of PolyGram. On March 18, 2002, it was re-released by Universal Pictures as part of an anthology called The World of Eric Carle that included The Very Hungry Caterpillar along with four other Eric Carle stories. 

This anthology utilized a classical music–influenced soundtrack by Wallace & Gromit composer Julian Nott. Narration on the UK releases were performed by Roger McGough and Juliet Stevenson; this version was briefly released in the US by Scholastic. Then on August 5, 1995 Disney released a US dub version with narration by Brian Cummings and Linda Gary. After Disney’s adaptation, the film and TV rights were sold for £1 million.

DVD 
The Very Hungry Caterpillar was released on DVD on April 24, 2006, as a part of an anthology called The World of Eric Carle; it was presented by the Illuminated Film Company and broadcast by Ventura Distribution.

The anthology, including The Very Hungry Caterpillar and four other stories, was also released on DVD in the US by Disney and in the AU by ABC. The DVD was also adapted into a 10-track CD, titled The Very Hungry Caterpillar and Other Stories.

Ancillary products
There have been multiple unique book editions, with personalized features. Games, pop-up books, a book/card game combination via University Games, and an educational video game- The Very Hungry Caterpillar's ABCs – released by CYBIRD Co. Ltd. for WiiWare in 2010.

Inaccuracies 
In the story, the caterpillar builds a cocoon, and a butterfly emerges. In reality, a caterpillar that makes a cocoon emerges as a moth, while a butterfly will emerge from a chrysalis; various media sources have highlighted this inaccuracy. 

Eric Carle responded to this by stating: 
"And here's my unscientific explanation: My caterpillar is very unusual. As you know caterpillars don’t eat lollipops and ice cream, so you won’t find my caterpillar in any field guides. But also, when I was a small boy, my father would say, "Eric, come out of your cocoon." He meant I should open up and be receptive to the world around me. For me, it would not sound right to say, "Come out of your chrysalis." And so poetry won over science!"

References and notes

External links

 Teacher's resource page at Carle website
 

1969 children's books
1993 television films
1993 films
American picture books
Animated anthology films
Picture books by Eric Carle
Fictional butterflies and moths
World Publishing Company books